Straggle Lake is a lake in the municipality of Dysart et al, Haliburton County in Central Ontario, Canada.

The primary inflow, at the southwest, is Straggle Creek. There are also two unnamed secondary inflows, at the south and northeast. The primary outflow, at the northwest, is also Straggle Creek, which heads first to Little Straggle Lake, and then via Allen Creek, the York River and the Madawaska River to the Ottawa River.

References

Lakes of Haliburton County